Rakhsh (in , meaning "luminous") is a wondrous stallion -the brave and faithful steed of the preeminent hero Rostam in the Persian national epic, Shahnameh by the poet Ferdowsi.

The color of Rakhsh is described as "rose leaves that have been scattered upon a saffron ground" and it is first noticed by Rostam amongst the herds of horses brought over from Zabulistan and Kabul. In this first encounter Rakhsh is described as a mighty colt with the chest and shoulders of a lion and it appears to have the strength of an elephant. He is highly intelligent and his loyalty is legendary. No one but Rostam ever rides Rakhsh, and Rakhsh recognizes no one but Rostam as his master. Also, he is the only horse ever that Rostam could ride, since his great strength and weight would kill other horses.

Due to divine favor protecting Rostam, Rakhsh lives an unusually long life. Rostam and Rakhsh both die by the treason of Rostam's half-brother, Shaghad.

Raḵšā (Rakhsha) in Aramaic means horse.

See also
 List of fictional horses

References

Persian mythology
Shahnameh characters
Fictional horses